Bansihari is a village in Bansihari CD Block in Gangarampur subdivision of Dakshin Dinajpur district in the state of West Bengal, India.

Geography

Location

The Tangon flows nearby.

In the map alongside, all places marked on the map are linked in the full screen version.

Police station
Bansihari police station under West Bengal police has jurisdiction over Bansihari CD Block.

Demographics
As per the 2011 Census of India, Bansihari had a total population of 930, of which 475 (51%) were males and 455 (49%) were females. Population below 6 years was 125. The total number of literates in Bansihari was 685 (85.09% of the population over 6 years).

Transport
Bansihari is located off the State Highway 10.

Education
Bansihari High School was established at Shibpur, an adjacent village, in 1952. It is a Bengali-medium co-educational higher secondary school. It has arrangements for teaching from Class VI to XII. It has 14 computers, 1,350 books in the library and a playground. Mid-day meals are prepared and served in the school.

References

Villages in Dakshin Dinajpur district